Pomeranian Medical University (PMU) was established in 1948 in Szczecin, Poland. It is referred to as Pomorski Uniwersytet Medyczny in Polish.

History
Viewed from a historical perspective, a period of 53 years, when compared with the multicentennial tradition of other universities, is short indeed. When one considers that Szczecin was never a seat of schools of higher learning and the establishment of the university took place just after an exceptionally devastating war with local physicians, scientists and teachers missing altogether, one must admit that 50 years of active existence of the university is an outstanding achievement.

The first organizers of the Pomeranian Medical University were Prof. Jakub Wegierko (first rector) and professors: Tadeusz Chorazak, Artur Chwalibogowski, Tadeusz Markiewicz, Czeslaw Murczynski, Tadeusz Sokolowski, Witold Starkiewicz, Kazimierz Stojalowski, Jozef Taniewski and January Zubrzycki. Soon to join them were professors: Izabela Cwojdzinska-Gadzikiewicz, Lech Dzialoszynski, Adam Krechowiecki, Wanda Murczynska, Jan Slotwinski, Eugeniusz Mietkiewski, Edward Gorzkowski, Irena Semadeni, Boleslaw Gornicki.

Owing to the significant number of professors settling in Szczecin, the Pomeranian Medical University became the sole school of higher learning in this town bestowed with full academic powers to hold doctoral and habilitated doctor studies and grant doctoral degrees.

The passion and efforts of the pioneers resulted in an increasing number of students and academic teachers, a widening scope and rising level of specialized health services, and in scientific research of growing importance.

In spite of financial and technical difficulties new lecture halls, student hostels and other buildings of social use were erected. These include two new lecture halls in the First and Second State Clinical Hospitals, three new hostels, the Main Library, one sports hall, three vacations centres, etc. Modern buildings for the Department of Clinical Biochemistry and for the Department of Psychiatry were erected.

At present the university has more than 1,370 beds in both State Clinical Hospitals and almost 400 beds in other hospitals in Szczecin. Altogether, there are approximately 1,780 beds in the clinical departments and the number of patients treated yearly exceeds 32,000.

Clinical departments of the University, besides offering sophisticated health care services for the Western Pomerania region, provide basic medical care because Szczecin does not possess a municipal hospital. Furthermore, the outpatient departments are an important element of the treatment and services base of the region, acting chiefly as specialized consultancy centres with a yearly number of visits exceeding 160,000.

Between 1994 and 2009 of young academic teachers in PMU procure prestigious scholarships of Polish Science Foundation. Presently the University has 1478 students, including 1012 students of medicine and 466 of dentistry.

Students' Scientific Association at PMU organises annual nationwide and international Medical Students’ Conference.

Administration

The Pomeranian Medical University has more than 500 faculty and almost 200 technical staff. Among the academic staff are 43 professors and 54 habilitated doctors. Since 1948 8060 physicians and 3314 dentists graduated from the University. 1113 researchers obtained the degree of doctor and 196 of habilitated doctor. Actually University employ 33 professors and 36 extraordinary professors.

The title of doctor honoris causa was granted to 15 renowned scientists: Prof. Dr. Witold Starkiewicz (1973), Prof. Dr. Kazimierz Stojalowski (1974), Prof. Dr. Eugeniusz Mietkiewski (1985), Prof. Dr. Jerzy Kulczycki (1987), Prof. Dr. Andre Raymond Ardaillou (1991), Prof. Dr. Marek Eisner (1992), Prof. Dr. Zbigniew Janczuk (1994), Prof. Dr. Franciszek Kokot (1995), Prof. Dr. Leonidas Samochowiec (1995), Prof. Dr. Hans Schadewaldt (1995), Prof. Dr. Eberhard Ritz (1996), Prof. Dr. Dietrich Kettler (1996), prof. Mary Osborne (1997), prof. Stanislaw Woyke (1998), prof. Alan Gewirtz (1999).

New, unconventional forms of teaching have been adopted during the academic year 1996/97. These are extramural studies in nursing leading to the title of master, studies for English-speaking students from Scandinavia, Europe, Israel, Canada and more, evening full-pay studies in medicine, the Faculty of Pharmacy shall be established in the near future.
Since long the Pomeranian Medical University maintains scientific ties with renowned foreign centres. Apart from previous co-operation with some centres in the European Union, the agreement signed with the Pennsylvania University in Philadelphia may be called the most important. These contacts have resulted in the exchange of junior scientists, as well as in numerous publications in reputable Western journals.

The strongest advantage of the Pomeranian Medical University in Szczecin lies in its staff - scientists, teachers and physicians - well-educated and strongly motivated to do a good job, in many instances keeping pace with forefront of world medicine.

Hopefully, some shortcomings as to the facilities and instrumentation may be overcome in the coming years, thanks to the commitment and enthusiasm of the staff of the Pomeranian Medical University. Hopefully, the co-operation with the health service system in the region, as well as with the Ministry and the Scientific Research Committee shall be even better.

The present authorities of the University have set many goals for the incoming years. The most important one is to improve the curriculum by modernizing and making more attractive the forms of teaching so that students graduating from our University be well prepared to meet the needs of their profession, but also call the period of studies as one of the best in their lives.

Students wanting more of their studies may deepen their knowledge and become acquainted with the methodology of scientific research by joining one of some 20 Student Scientific Groups, now with almost 100 members. On December 6-7th, 2000, All-Polish Conference of the Student Scientific Groups was held. Furthermore, members of the Student Scientific Society participate in national and foreign conferences. Following their graduation and an internship of 12 months some of these students join the staff of their Alma Mater each year.

Facilities
Important centres for information and documentation, indispensable for research activities, are the Main Library and the Publishing Division of PMU.

The Main Library continues to grow since 1949, albeit with varying pace over the years. It has two sections in the Clinical Hospitals, stores more than 260,000 books and offers 584 periodicals. Scientific, experimental, clinical, historical and bibliographic papers appear in the Annals of the university since 1950. Initially, the Annals were published irregularly in the form of separate collections of papers, but since 1962 they constitute a regular, reviewed scientific publication under the title of Annales Academiae Medicae Stetinensis indexed i.a. in Index Medicus. In principle, the Annals contain condensed versions of doctoral theses, while supplements usually contain habilitated doctor theses.

The Publishing Division is the editor of other publications such as handbooks for students, post-graduate education aids, medical and administrative guide-books, growing steadily since 1969.

Faculties 
The university consists of four faculties:
 Faculty of Medicine:
 Medicine specialization
 Medicine specialization - English programme
 Faculty of Dentistry:
 Dentistry specialization
 Dentistry specialization - English programme
 Dental hygienist specialization
 Faculty of Biotechnology:
 Medical technologist specialization (Clinical Laboratory Science)
 Biotechnology specialization (Medical Biotechnology)
 Faculty of Health Sciences:
 Paramedic specialization
 Midwifery specialization
 Physiotherapy specialization
 Clinical Nurse specialization
 Public Health specialization
 Cosmetology specialization

The university has also English programme for foreign students. They intend to establish a faculty of Pharmacy in the future.

Clinical Hospitals 
 Official website of Clinical Hospital No. 1
 Official website of Clinical Hospital No. 2
 Official website of Clinical Hospital "Police" in Police, Poland - a town near Szczecin
 Official website of Klinikum Uckermark in Schwedt, Germany

Dentistry Center 
 Official website of PMU Dentistry Center

References

External links 

 Pomeranian Medical University - Foreign Medical Students Association Website
 
 Pomeranian Medical University - International Hereditary Cancer Center
 Pomeranian Medical University - Polish Students Website
 Students' Scientific Association at PMU
 Pomeranian Medical University - 360 Panorama - bird's eye view

Universities and colleges in Poland
Medical schools in Poland
Universities and colleges in Szczecin